is a railway station in Nakamura-ku, Nagoya, Aichi Prefecture, Japan.

Line
Kintetsu Nagoya Line

Layout
Kogane Station has two side platforms serving a track each on the ground.

Platforms

Staff at our station 
The number of passengers per day of the station is as follows.

Year       number of people 

 2015 11 10     2475
 2012 11 13     2151
 2010 11  9      2252
 2008 11 18     2307
 2005 11  8      2159

Surroundings
Nagoya Kintetsu Taxi Kogane Office
JR Central Nagoya Depot
JR Central Nagoya Workshop
JR Freight Nagoya Depot
Sasashima Signal Box (JR Central Kansai Line, Aonami Line)

Adjacent stations

Railway stations in Aichi Prefecture